Borgne is a commune in the Borgne Arrondissement, in Nord department of Haiti. The economy there is based on agriculture and fishery. Other nearby places include Port-Margot, Robin, and Fond La Grange. Borgne is currently in the early stages of developing a "sister cities" relationship with Honeoye Falls, New York, United States.

Communal Sections 
The commune consists of seven communal sections, namely:
 Margot, rural
 Boucan Michel, rural
 Petit Bourg de Borgne, urban (Petit Bourg de Borgne neighborhood) and rural
 Trou d'Enfer, rural
 Champagne, rural
 Molas, rural
 Côte de Fer et Fond Lagrange, urban (town of Borgne) and rural

External links 
 Satellite view of Borgne

References 

Populated places in Nord (Haitian department)
Communes of Haiti